The Sherborn Collection is a collection of 1841-85 Queen Victoria embossed 1d pink postal stationery stamped envelopes that forms part of the British Library Philatelic Collections. The collection was formed by C. Davis Sherborn and donated to the British Museum in 1913.

References

British Library Philatelic Collections
Philately of the United Kingdom
Postal stationery